Sabrina Tavernise (born February 24, 1971) is an American journalist who writes for The New York Times, and is a co-host of the Times podcast The Daily. She has been a war correspondent for the Times from Iraq, Lebanon, and Russia, including recent dispatches from the Russian invasion of Ukraine.

Early life and education 
Raised in Granville, Massachusetts, Tavernise went to Westfield High School, and graduated in 1993 with a B.A. in Russian studies from Barnard College of Columbia University.

In 1995, she moved to Magadan, Russia, where she managed a business training center funded by the United States Agency for International Development.

Career 
In 1997, after moving to Moscow, Tavernise was a freelance writer for publications including BusinessWeek. From 1997 to 1999, she worked for Bloomberg News.

In 2000, she joined The New York Times as a Moscow correspondent; from 2003 to 2007 she was based in Iraq, where her coverage included 2005 sectarian cleansing. Later she moved to Pakistan, and Turkey, as the bureau chief in Istanbul.

In 2010, she became a national correspondent covering demographics, and was the lead writer for the Times on the 2010 United States census, capturing major demographic shifts underway in the United States, including in mortality and fertility, race and ethnicity.

In March 2022, Tavernise joined Michael Barbaro as the second host of The New York Times podcast The Daily, following her dispatches from the Russian invasion of Ukraine.

Awards 
In the 2003 Kurt Schork awards, Tavernise received an honorable mention for "her depth and human insight in covering Russia".

References

External links

 Recent and archived news articles by Sabrina Tavernise of The New York Times
 Pakistan’s Islamic Schools Fill Void, but Fuel Militancy New York Times 2009-05-03 by Sabrina Tavernise. During a U.S. congressional hearing on Pakistan held 2009-05-05, Special Representative for Afghanistan and Pakistan Richard Holbrooke referenced Tavernise's article during the hearing, as did several representatives.
 

1971 births
Living people
Writers from Hartford, Connecticut
Barnard College alumni
American writers of Italian descent
American women war correspondents
The New York Times writers
American women journalists
People from Granville, Massachusetts
Journalists from Connecticut
Journalists from Massachusetts
20th-century American journalists
20th-century American women writers
21st-century American journalists
21st-century American women writers